Blackballed are an English rock band from Manchester. Formed in 2012 by New Model Army guitarist Marshall Gill, his brother Leon and Tom Wibberley, the band has toured extensively in the UK, including well-known festivals such as Beautiful Days and Bearded Theory, and has also played in Germany, Luxembourg and the Netherlands.  They have released three albums, Colossus in 2014, Fulton's Point in 2017. and "Elephant in the Room" in 2020.

Discography

Albums 
Colossus (2014)
Fulton's Point (2017)
Elephant in the Room (2020)

EPs
Blackballed (2013)
Broken Bones (????)

Members 
 Marshall Gill - Vocals, Guitar 
 Alex Whitehead - Drums
 Tom Wibberley - Bass Guitar

References

External links
 Official website

English rock music groups
Musical groups established in 2012
English blues rock musical groups
2012 establishments in England